Wilbur Jacob "Goby" Gobrecht (born 1931) is a former an American football and basketball player and coach.

Playing career
Gobrecht was an all-conference halfback for Dickinson College from 1949 until 1952, where he also played on the basketball team.

Coaching career
Gobrecht was the head football coach at Dickinson College in Carlisle, Pennsylvania and he held that position for 16 seasons, from 1965 until 1979 and then returning for the 1984 season.   His coaching record at Dickinson was 52–76–7.

References

1931 births
Living people
American football halfbacks
Dickinson Red Devils football coaches
Dickinson Red Devils football players
Dickinson Red Devils men's basketball players
College men's track and field athletes in the United States
High school basketball coaches in Pennsylvania
High school football coaches in Pennsylvania
United States Marine Corps officers
People from Hanover, Pennsylvania
Players of American football from Pennsylvania
Basketball players from Pennsylvania
American men's basketball players
Military personnel from Pennsylvania